Robert Pye may refer to:
Sir Robert Pye (Royalist) (1585–1662), English courtier, administrator and politician, MP between 1621 and 1629
Sir Robert Pye (Roundhead) (c. 1620 – 1701), Parliamentarian son of the Royalist, MP at various times between 1640 and 1660